Federico Turrini (born 21 July 1987) is an Italian swimmer who competes in the Men's 400m individual medley. At the 2012 Summer Olympics he finished joint 19th overall in the heats in the Men's 400 metre individual medley and failed to reach the final. At the 2013 Mediterranean Games held in Mersin, Turkey he won the gold medal in 200 individual medley by 1:59:35.

References

1987 births
Living people
Italian male backstroke swimmers
Olympic swimmers of Italy
Swimmers at the 2012 Summer Olympics
Swimmers at the 2016 Summer Olympics
Italian male medley swimmers
Mediterranean Games gold medalists for Italy
Mediterranean Games silver medalists for Italy
Swimmers at the 2013 Mediterranean Games
Swimmers at the 2018 Mediterranean Games
Universiade medalists in swimming
Mediterranean Games medalists in swimming
Universiade bronze medalists for Italy
Medalists at the 2007 Summer Universiade
Italian male freestyle swimmers
20th-century Italian people
21st-century Italian people